This article lists the complete results of the group stage of the 2008 Thomas Cup in Jakarta, Indonesia.

Group A

China vs. Nigeria

Canada vs. Nigeria

China vs. Canada

Group B

Malaysia vs. England

Korea vs. England

Malaysia vs. Korea

Group C

Denmark vs. New Zealand

Japan vs. New Zealand

Denmark vs. Japan

Group D

Germany vs. Thailand

Indonesia vs. Thailand

Indonesia vs. Germany

Thomas Cup Group Stage, 2008